Phuentshogpelri Gewog (Dzongkha: ཕུན་ཚོགས་དབལ་རི་) is a gewog (village block) of Samtse District, Bhutan.

References

Gewogs of Bhutan
Samtse District